Zhora Hovhannisyan (born 16 April 1987) is an Armenian footballer.

Club career
Hovhannisyan played for FC Pyunik before switching in July 2004 to Greek team Olympiacos. In January 2008, he moved on loan from Olympiacos to Greek Beta Ethniki club Agios Dimitrios. Hovhannisyan joined Doxa Kranoula in July 2008 and, in January 2009, moved to A.O. Kymis, which participates in the local amateur league of Euboea (division 1). In 2010, Zhora joined the now disbanded Russian club Saturn Moscow Oblast. Soon afterward, he joined Lokomotiv Tashkent which was coached by his father Khoren Hovhannisyan. Zhora Hovhannisyan had been announced the best foreign player of Uzbekistan in 2012. Later, in the year of 2013, he signed with most successful Uzbek club, Pakhtakor Tashkent, and was given the No. 10 jersey. He was included in the roster of Pakhtakor for the 2013 season of the AFC Champions League. Hovhannisyan scored his first goal for Pakhtakor in a home 2–0 victory over Neftchi FK.

International career
Hovhannisyan is a former member of the Armenia U-19 junior team and Armenia U-21 youth team. He has not been called to the Armenia national football team because of the national team's already strong attacking midfield, according to head coach Vardan Minasyan. Minasyan said he will always keep him under their spotlight and that it's possible he will be invited to the national team in future.

Personal life
Zhora's father is former Soviet footballer Khoren Hovhannisyan, ex-president of Armenia's FC Pyunik team and the Golden Player of Armenia recipient of the UEFA Jubilee Awards.

References

External links

1987 births
Living people
Footballers from Yerevan
Armenian footballers
Armenian expatriate footballers
Association football midfielders
FC Pyunik players
Olympiacos F.C. players
PFC Lokomotiv Tashkent players
Pakhtakor Tashkent FK players
Expatriate footballers in Greece
Expatriate footballers in Russia
Expatriate footballers in Uzbekistan
Armenian expatriate sportspeople in Greece
Armenian expatriate sportspeople in Russia
Armenian expatriate sportspeople in Uzbekistan
Armenian Premier League players
Doxa Kranoula F.C. players
FC Saturn Ramenskoye players